Safara e Santo Aleixo da Restauração is a civil parish in the municipality of Moura, Portugal. The population in 2011 was 1,871, in an area of 237.20 km2. It was formed in 2013 by the merger of the former parishes Safara and Santo Aleixo da Restauração.

References

Freguesias of Moura, Portugal